The 1995 International Tennis Championships was a men's ATP tennis tournament held in Coral Springs, Florida in the United States and played on outdoor clay courts. The event was part of the World Series of the 1995 ATP Tour. It was the third edition of the tournament and was held from May 15 to May 22, 1995. Unseeded Todd Woodbridge won the singles title.

Finals

Singles

 Todd Woodbridge defeated  Greg Rusedski 6–4, 6–2 
 It was Woodbridge's 5th title of the year and the 32nd of his career.

Doubles

 Todd Woodbridge /  Mark Woodforde defeated  Sergio Casal /  Emilio Sánchez 6–3, 6–1  
 It was Woodbridge's 4th title of the year and the 31st of his career. It was Woodforde's 4th title of the year and the 36th of his career.

References

External links
 ITF tournament edition details

International Tennis Championships
International Tennis Championships
International Tennis Championships
Delray Beach Open
Coral Springs, Florida